Andre Bowden (born April 4, 1968) is a former fullback and linebacker in the Arena Football League and became the all-time leading rusher for the Tampa Bay Storm from 1993-1994, 1997-2001, 2003-2004.

Bowden played college football for Fayetteville State University.

Bowden was also in the National Football League. He was with the New England Patriots in the 1994 and 1995 seasons, but did not see any playing time. On March 23, 2002, Bowden signed with the Carolina Cobras.

External links
Just Sports Stats

References

1968 births
Living people
People from Fuquay-Varina, North Carolina
Players of American football from North Carolina
American football fullbacks
American football linebackers
African-American players of American football
Tampa Bay Storm players
Fayetteville State Broncos football players
Frankfurt Galaxy players
Carolina Cobras players
New England Patriots players